{{DISPLAYTITLE:C29H52}}
The molecular formula C29H52 (molar mass: 400.72 g/mol) may refer to:

 Fusidane (29-nor protostane)
 Poriferastane (24S-ethylcholestane)
 Stigmastane (24R-ethylcholestane)

Molecular formulas